Bass v Gregory (1890) is an English tort law and English land law case, concerning a ventilation shaft on under or through adjoining land (a "passage of air"). It was deemed an easement by prescription, having been used without long interruptions for forty years.  At the time of the case, the law, and the leading judge made a fine technical distinction between prescription by statute and by the common law doctrine of lost modern grant.

Facts
Bass and her tenant owned a pub called The Jolly Anglers in Meadow Road, Beeston, Nottingham. They brought a claim against the owner of neighbouring land (including the cottage in which he lived), Gregory, for blocking a ventilation shaft out of Bass' cellar. Bass brewed beer in the cellar, and the ventilation shaft allowed the fumes to run out of the cellar, through the ground, which connected to Gregory's water well, out of which the air escaped. The shaft had existed for at least 40 years.

Judgment
Pollock B held that Bass had a right to the passage, because the law deemed that if a right had been exercised for a long number of years, there was a legal foundation to the right. He said the following.

See also

English land law

Notes

References
RH Coase, ‘The Problem of Social Cost’ (1960) 3 Journal of Law and Economics 1, 14

English land case law
1890 in case law
1890 in British law